Travelling Market (lit. Wandering Market) is a South Korean television program hosted by Seo Jang-hoon, Jang Yoon-jeong and Yoo Se-yoon. It aired on JTBC every Sunday at 19:40 (KST), from February 16 to August 9, 2020.

Overview
In each episode, the cast members visit a celebrity's residence (the celebrity labelled as the episode's Client). The Client will introduce his/her residence, their belongings to sell and the memories with these belongings. The cast members each take charge of selling a number of the belongings through Danggeun Market, an online second-hand shopping portal. In some episodes, a special guest will join in at the residence and have the cast members to sell his/her belongings as well, or guest as an Intern Selling Fairy, in which he/she will also compete against the cast members to sell the belongings. When a negotiation with a buyer, who usually is one within the vicinity of the celebrity's home, is successful, the celebrity and the cast member in charge of the item would personally meet the buyer to finish the deal. The cast member with the most number of items sold (or the highest of the amount earned if there's a tie in number of items sold) will be the episode's Selling King. After completion of filming each episode, the production team would sell the unsold items behind the scenes, and their new owners will be shown.

Originally, the unsold items after the first selling phase (which consists of selling on filming day itself, and the production team selling behind the scenes) would still be kept by the celebrity. However, starting from episode 6, viewers all around South Korea can buy the celebrity's belongings that were not sold after the first selling phase through the show's website after each episode was aired. The second selling phase would be on a first come, first served basis.

Episodes

Ratings

Notes

References

South Korean variety television shows
South Korean reality television series
2020 South Korean television series debuts
2020 South Korean television series endings
Korean-language television shows
JTBC original programming